Naib Subedar Chhering Mutup, AC is a retired Junior Commissioned Officer (JCO) with the Ladakh Scouts who was awarded the Ashoka Chakra, India's highest peacetime military decoration.

On 21 February 1985, Lance Havildar Chhering Mutup headed a team of soldiers that attacked and captured a crest in the Siachen glacier. In spite of bad weather and poor visibility, Chhering and his team accomplished the difficult task.

Early life
Chhering Mutup was born in Likir, Leh, Ladakh and joined the Ladakh Scouts in 1965.

Military career
Chhering volunteered to lead a patrol to capture the crest line overlooking an Indian post on the Saltoro ridge. He accomplished the task in extremely hostile weather in high altitude. For the gallantry he displayed, he was awarded the Ashok Chakra in 1985.   He retired as an Honorary Naib Subedar on 1July, 1989.

Ashoka Chakra Citation 
The Ashoka Chakra citation on the Official Indian Army Website reads as follows:

Family
Mutup's son Sewang Mutup is a serving Subedar Major in the Indian Army and was awarded the Vir Chakra for outstanding gallantry in the 1999 Kargil War.

References

External links
 https://www.hindustantimes.com/india-news/army-hero-plans-to-carry-back-onions-to-leh/story-zuCknQfOl51UhrIGWohGSJ.html

Indian Army personnel
Recipients of the Ashoka Chakra (military decoration)
Ashoka Chakra